Space Jam is a 1996 pinball machine released by Sega Pinball.  It is based on the film of the same name.

Features 
On the main playfield, there are six red arrows pointing to critical targets. From left to right: Left Loop, Captive Ball, Basket, Jump Ball, Ramp, and Right Loop. The purpose of these targets is to help players complete some of the seven planets surrounding Michael Jordan as well as score jackpots in Multiball mode.

There is also a basket at the end of the launch ramp for skill shot opportunities. Before launching the ball with the plunger, players can choose an award to receive upon a successful skill shot into the launch basket: 300,000 points, Lite Lock / Lock Ball (advances one level up in the Jump Ball), Wabbit Hole (randomly selects a mystery prize or mini-game to be played), or Super Pops (increases the bumper threshold's strength). If the player does not make the basket, 50,000 points will still be awarded. However, if the player does make the basket and had selected 300,000 points, Lite Lock / Lock Ball, or Super Pops, he/she will be given a few seconds to earn a super skill shot by shooting the left basket ramp for 10 basketball points.

The coin lock door has 3 buttons. Two of them control the volume, while the third opens the Settings Menu. The menu allows players to adjust various settings: level of difficulty, frequency of extra ball awards, tilt sensitivity, and lighting. Changing the level of difficulty affects the requirements to unlock certain mini-games as well as the time limit to complete certain tasks.

External links 
 IPDB listing for Space Jam
 Pinball Archive rule sheet
 Recent Auction Results for Space Jam

Pinball machines based on films
Sega pinball machines
1996 pinball machines
Space Jam